Manuel Konrad (born 14 April 1988) is a German professional footballer who played as a midfielder for Bayernliga club FC Memmingen.

Career
Konrad began his career with SC Freiburg, whom he had joined from Ulm in 2003. Konrad made his debut for Freiburg on 25 August 2006, in a 1–1 draw with SpVgg Unterhaching. He moved to SpVgg Unterhaching on loan on 27 January 2009 and later, on 8 June 2009, signed permanently with the club. After one season, he signed for FSV Frankfurt.

Career statistics

References

External links
 
 

Living people
1988 births
People from Illertissen
Sportspeople from Swabia (Bavaria)
German footballers
Footballers from Bavaria
Association football midfielders
Germany youth international footballers
2. Bundesliga players
3. Liga players
Regionalliga players
Oberliga (football) players
Malaysia Super League players
SSV Ulm 1846 players
SC Freiburg players
SC Freiburg II players
SpVgg Unterhaching players
SpVgg Unterhaching II players
FSV Frankfurt players
Dynamo Dresden players
KFC Uerdingen 05 players
Selangor FA players
SG Sonnenhof Großaspach players
FC Memmingen players
German expatriate footballers
German expatriate sportspeople in Malaysia
Expatriate footballers in Malaysia